Donald Dalrymple (1814 – 19 September 1873) was an English surgeon and Liberal politician who sat in the House of Commons from 1868 to 1873.

Dalrymple was the son of  William Dalrymple  of Norwich, and his wife Marianne Bertram, daughter of Benjamin Bertram. He was educated at Norwich Grammar School and became a doctor. He was a Licenciate of the Apothecaries' Co., a Fellow of the Royal College of Surgeons, and a member of the Royal College of Physicians. Dalrymple practiced as a surgeon for many years, but retired before entering parliament.

Dalrymple served as Sheriff of Norwich from 1860 to 1861 and a J.P. and Deputy Lieutenant of Norfolk.  He was a director of the Norwich Union Fire Insurance Co., and chairman of the Governors of King Edward VI. Schools. Dalrymple was also a Fellow of the Royal Geographical Society and was the author of On the Climate of Egypt.

At the 1868 general election, Dalrymple was elected Member of Parliament for Bath. He held the seat until his death in 1873 at age 59.

He died on 19 September 1873.

Dalrymple married Sarah Springfield, daughter of Thomas Osborn Springfield. She died at Thorpe Lodge, Norwich, on 24 March 1900, aged 79 years.

References

External links

1814 births
1873 deaths
UK MPs 1868–1874
English surgeons
Fellows of the Royal College of Surgeons
Fellows of the Royal College of Physicians
Fellows of the Royal Geographical Society
Liberal Party (UK) MPs for English constituencies
Deputy Lieutenants of Norfolk
Politicians from Norwich
Medical doctors from Norwich